Mnesarchella dugdalei is a species of primitive moths in the family Mnesarchaeidae. This species was first described by George William Gibbs in 2019, and is endemic to New Zealand. This species can be found in the Auckland, Coromandel, Waikato, Bay of Plenty, Taranaki, Taupō, Gisborne and Hawke's Bay regions. M. dugdalei lives in damp but well lit forest sites at altitudes of between 200 m and 1300 m. Adults of this species are on the wing from October to December.

Taxonomy 

This species was first described by George William Gibbs in 2019 and named M. dugdalei in honour of John Stewart Dugdale. The male holotype was collected at Fairy Falls Track in the Waitakere Ranges by Dugdale in December and is held in the New Zealand Arthropod Collection.

Description 
This species is small with pale brown forewings iridescent with brass colour tones. There are two white thin lines on the forewings.

Distribution 
This species is endemic to New Zealand and found in the Auckland, Coromandel, Waikato, Bay of Plenty, Taranaki, Taupo, Gisborne and Hawkes Bay regions.

Behaviour and habitat 
Adults of this species are on the wing from October to December. This species lives in damp but well lit forest sites at altitudes of between 200 m and 1300 m.

Host species 
As at 2019, the larvae of this species are unknown as are the larval hosts of M. dugdalei.

References

Moths described in 2019
Endemic fauna of New Zealand
Moths of New Zealand
Mnesarchaeoidea
Taxa named by George William Gibbs
Endemic moths of New Zealand